The 1949–50 season was the 77th season of competitive football in Scotland and the 53rd season of the Scottish Football League.

Scottish League Division A

Rangers won the league with a 2–2 draw in their last match, away to Third Lanark, a game in which Rangers took a 2–0 lead before Thirds fought back to 2–2. Another goal for Third Lanark would have handed the title to Hibernian.

A few days previously, Rangers had drawn 0–0 with Hibs at Ibrox before a crowd of 101,000, the largest crowd to watch a League match in Britain since the war, a record that still stands. Had Hibs won this match they would have become champions.

Champions: Rangers
Relegated: Queen Of the South, Stirling Albion

Scottish League Division B

Promoted: Morton, Airdrie

Scottish League Division C

Cup honours

Other Honours

National

County

 * - aggregate over two legs
  - replay

Highland League

Scotland national team

Key:
 (H) = Home match
 (A) = Away match
 BHC = British Home Championship

Notes and references

External links
Scottish Football Historical Archive

 
Seasons in Scottish football